The Honorable Faustine Villanneau Chebou Kamdem Fotso born on June 12, 1965, is a computer scientist, environmentalist, and lawyer from Cameroon.

Public life  
In 2012, Fotso was 1st Deputy Mayor of Baham, a town in Western Cameroon. In 2013, she was elected MP in the National Parliament Assembly, representing the highlands of the Western Region. She sits on the Constitutional Laws Committee and belongs to the Cameroon People's Democratic Movement.

Academic works 
Fotso wrote the publication "Environmental Impact Study in French and Cameroonian Law" in 2009 as part of the Masters Program of International and Environmental Law at the University of Limoges.

Charitable works 
Fotso is the founder of the charitable association "Flame of Love, of Peace and Justice" that had its inaugural meeting on September 20, 2016.

Awards 
On May 20, 2016, Fotso was awarded the civilian medal to the rank of the officer of the order of value at the 44th National Day of Unity in Baham.

Family 
Fotso is married to Lucas Fotso, regional director for the Cameroon electric company Aes Sonel Littoral. Together they have five children.

References 

1989 births
Living people
Cameroon People's Democratic Movement politicians
Cameroonian environmentalists
Cameroonian lawyers
Members of the National Assembly (Cameroon)
Computer scientists
21st-century women lawyers
21st-century Cameroonian women politicians
21st-century Cameroonian politicians